The University of Connecticut (UConn) School of Business is a graduate and undergraduate public business school that spans across four campuses, with the main campus located in Storrs, Connecticut.

The UConn School of Business was founded in 1941 and offers academic programs at the bachelors, MBA, Executive MBA, doctorate and advanced certificate levels.

Campuses

Storrs
The main campus in Storrs is home to the business school's primary administrative functions, outreach initiatives, undergraduate and Ph.D. programs, as well as the graduate programs in accounting and human resource management. Students study in a $27 million research and learning facility located in the campus near the Student Union, Co-op Bookstore, Gampel Pavilion and the Homer Babbidge Library. Built in early 2000, the four-story, 100,000-square-foot facility, houses the School's five academic departments (accounting, finance, management, marketing, and operations and information management), as well as faculty, staff, classes and a lounge.

Hartford
The University of Connecticut Graduate Business Learning Center (GBLC) is located at 100 Constitution Plaza in downtown Hartford, Connecticut, and is home to the business school's Full-time, Part-time and Executive MBA Program offices, classrooms and conference facilities, as well as the Student Managed Fund, SS&C Technologies Financial Accelerator, SCOPE.  The GBLC was remodeled in 2004.

Waterbury 
With an enrollment of approximately 1,000 students, UConn's Waterbury campus offers the four-year bachelor's degree program with majors in business administration and business data analytics. At the graduate level, the Waterbury campus offers the Part-time MBA degree and some graduate business certificate coursework.

Stamford 
UConn's campus in downtown Stamford provides internships, field placements and jobs with companies and non-profit organizations headquartered in Fairfield county.

Online 
UConn's School of Business offers a number of programs fully online. Programs such as the online Master of Business Administration (OMBA), a Master's in Human Resource Management and the Master of Science in Accounting (MSA) utilize some of today's most interactive and innovative technologies.

Academics

Academic Areas
The UConn School of Business offers programs in a variety of functional disciplines — Accounting, Finance, Management, Marketing, and Operations and Information Management. The School of Business also offers interdisciplinary centers in economics, entrepreneurship and innovation, international business, and real estate, as well as programs in health care management and insurance studies.

Accounting
The department was the first accounting program in New England to receive separate national accreditation by AACSB International.  The department offers Bachelors, Masters, and a Ph.D.  The Masters of Science in Accounting has been 100% online since 2003 and is consistently ranked among the top online non-MBA masters programs in the country.  The accounting department faculty includes a recipient of the American Accounting Association Notable Contributions to Accounting Literature Award  and two recipients of the American Accounting Association / Deloitte Foundation Wildman Award.

Finance
The Department of Finance provides education in a range of finance-related fields such as: corporate or business finance, financial management in government and not-for-profit organizations, financial planning, investments, banking, insurance, real estate, public accounting, and health systems.

Marketing
The Marketing Department at the University of Connecticut consists of faculty in marketing and business law.

Operations and Information Management
The Department of Operations and Information Management (OPIM) at the University of Connecticut offers undergraduate majors in Management Information Systems and in Management and Engineering for Manufacturing.

The MIS concentration at UConn is ranked 22nd nationally among public and private programs by U.S. News & World Report.

Accredation & Rankings
The UConn School of Business has been continuously accredited by AACSB International – the Association to Advance Collegiate Schools of Business – since 1958. AACSB International accreditation represents the highest standard of achievement for business schools worldwide. The School ranks in the top 5 percent of business schools and is widely considered one of the best in the United States as evidenced in frequent rankings by Bloomberg Businessweek, Forbes, U.S. News & World Report and The Princeton Review.

The School of Business is very selective. Approximately 26% of applicants were admitted to the M.B.A. program in 2012 with a median GPA of 3.5 and a GMAT score of 620. For undergraduate students, the School requires an application to transfer from elsewhere in the university. In 2016, 55% of UConn students who applied to the School of Business were accepted with an average cumulative GPA of 3.64.

Considered a Public Ivy, the main campus of the University of Connecticut is located in Storrs and is considered one of the leading research universities in the United States.

Research Centers
Research centers are an integral part of the UConn School of Business, supporting teaching, advancing scholarship and innovation, and providing a professional forum for exchange between faculty, students and the corporate community.

As one of 17 Centers for International Business Education & Research located in universities throughout the U.S., the UConn CIBER is mandated to increase the competitiveness of U.S. business in the global marketplace. The UConn School of Business first received the CIBER grant from the Department of Education in 1995 as part of the Higher Education Act.

The Connecticut Center for Economic Analysis (CCEA), is a University Center located within the School of Business at the University of Connecticut (UConn). CCEA specializes in economic impact and policy analysis studies, as well as advising clients regarding business strategy, market analysis, and related topics.

The Center for Real Estate and Urban Economic Studies provides services to Connecticut's real estate professionals and to the Department of Consumer Protection.

Notable alumni
Timothy J. Conway – founder, chairman and CEO, NewStar Financial
John Huang - Commerce Department official convicted of felony conspiracy
Viren Kapadia - President and CEO of Gyrus Systems (company)
William S. Simon, Jr. – Retired EVP and COO, Wal-Mart Stores, Inc.

See also
List of United States business school rankings
List of business schools in the United States

References

Business schools in Connecticut
Education in Hartford, Connecticut
University of Connecticut
Educational institutions established in 1941
Buildings and structures in Hartford, Connecticut
Universities and colleges in Fairfield County, Connecticut
Universities and colleges in Hartford County, Connecticut
Education in Stamford, Connecticut
Waterbury, Connecticut
Universities and colleges in Tolland County, Connecticut
Universities and colleges in New Haven County, Connecticut
1941 establishments in Connecticut